Isabel Lorenza (Lorencita) Ramírez de Arellano y Bartoli (July 8, 1902 – March 5, 1970) was the first wife of former Governor of Puerto Rico Luis A. Ferré and served as First Lady from 1968 until her death in 1970.

Ramírez de Arellano was born on Esperanza Street in San Germán, Puerto Rico to Alfredo Ramírez de Arellano y Rosell (1880–1961). She had a younger brother, Alfredo Ramírez de Arellano y Bartoli (1915 – 2011), who would go on to establish the first television broadcasting station, WORA-TV, in the western area of Puerto Rico, as well as the first frequency-modulated radio station there, WORA-FM.

In 1931, she met Luis A. Ferré and married a few months later on May 30, 1931. They had two children together: Antonio Luis and Rosario.

When her husband, Ferré, won the 1968 general elections, Ramírez de Arellano assumed the role of First Lady. However, she died on March 5, 1970, one year after Ferré was sworn in.

References

External links
 

1902 births
1970 deaths
First Ladies and Gentlemen of Puerto Rico
Burials at Santa María Magdalena de Pazzis Cemetery
People from San Germán, Puerto Rico
Politicians from Ponce
Puerto Rican Roman Catholics